Layham is a small village and a civil parish in southern Suffolk, England, situated between the town of Hadleigh and the neighbouring village of Raydon.

The civil parish contains the villages of Upper Layham and Lower Layham, separated by the River Brett. It is part of the Babergh district and falls within the South Suffolk parliamentary constituency.

It has a church, St Andrews, and a public house, The Queen's Head, which are both situated in Lower Layham.  More information on these and other aspects of Layham appear on the Parish Council's web site.

History
Layham is mentioned in the Little Domesday book.

Notable residents
Thomas D'Oyly (16th C), antiquary.

References

External links

Villages in Suffolk
Babergh District
Civil parishes in Suffolk